The 1996–97 Cypriot Third Division was the 26th season of the Cypriot third-level football league. Rotsidis Mammari won their 1st title.

Format
Fourteen teams participated in the 1996–97 Cypriot Third Division. All teams played against each other twice, once at their home and once away. The team with the most points at the end of the season crowned champions. The first three teams were promoted to the 1997–98 Cypriot Second Division and the last three teams were relegated to the 1997–98 Cypriot Fourth Division.

Point system
Teams received three points for a win, one point for a draw and zero points for a loss.

Changes from previous season
Teams promoted to 1996–97 Cypriot Second Division
 Ermis Aradippou
 Achyronas Liopetriou
 AEK Kakopetrias

Teams relegated from 1995–96 Cypriot Second Division
 Ethnikos Latsion FC
 Othellos Athienou
 Ayia Napa

Teams promoted from 1995–96 Cypriot Fourth Division
 Iraklis Gerolakkou
 ASIL Lysi
 Kinyras Empas

Teams relegated to 1996–97 Cypriot Fourth Division
 Digenis Oroklinis
 Digenis Akritas Ipsona
 Fotiakos Frenarou

League standings

Results

See also
 Cypriot Third Division
 1996–97 Cypriot First Division
 1996–97 Cypriot Cup

Sources

Cypriot Third Division seasons
Cyprus
1996–97 in Cypriot football